The Michoacán slender blind snake (Rena bressoni), also known commonly as la culebrilla ciega de Michoacán in Spanish, is a species of snake in the family Leptotyphlopidae. The species is endemic to Michoacán, Mexico.

Etymology
The specific name, bressoni, is in honor of Julio Raymond Bresson, who collected the type specimen.

Habitat
The preferred natural habitat of R. bressoni is forest.

Behavior
R. bressoni is terrestrial and fossorial.

Reproduction
R. bressoni is oviparous.

References

Further reading
Adalsteinsson SA, Branch WR, Trape S, Vitt LJ, Hedges SB (2009). "Molecular phylogeny, classification, and biogeography of snakes of the family Leptotyphlopidae (Reptilia, Squamata)". Zootaxa 2244: 1-50. (Rena bressoni, new combination).
Heimes P (2016). Snakes of Mexico: Herpetofauna Mexicana Vol. 1. Frankfurt, Germany: Chimaira. 572 pp. .
Taylor EH (1939). "On North American Snakes of the Genus Leptotyphlops ". Copeia 1939 (1): 1–7. (Leptotyphlops bressoni, new species).

Rena (genus)
Snakes of North America
Endemic reptiles of Mexico
Fauna of the Trans-Mexican Volcanic Belt
Reptiles described in 1939
Taxa named by Edward Harrison Taylor